My Date Comics was a short-lived comics series that ran from July 1947 to January 1948.
The title was the first in the "romance humor" genre. It was a collaboration between Joe Simon and Jack Kirby.

They mainly concerned Swifty Chase, a lovestruck athlete who competed with rival Snubby Skeemer for the hand of Sunny Daye.

The most colourful character was House-Date Harry, a lanky teen who preferred to entertain his dates in their homes and not go out.

References

External links 
 GCD page
 Not Kirby, My Date #4 Jack Kirby Museum
 My Date Checklist Jack Kirby Museum

Romance comics
Defunct American comics
Humor comics
Comics by Jack Kirby
1947 comics debuts
1948 comics endings